Aleksei Sergeyevich Smirnov (born 15 April 1994) is a Russian football player who plays for FC KAMAZ Naberezhnye Chelny.

Club career
He made his debut in the Russian Professional Football League for FC Tekstilshchik Ivanovo on 27 September 2013 in a game against FC Sever Murmansk. He made his Russian Football National League debut for Tekstilshchik on 24 July 2019 in a game against FC Krasnodar-2.

References

1994 births
Sportspeople from Ivanovo
Living people
Russian footballers
Association football goalkeepers
FC Tekstilshchik Ivanovo players
FC KAMAZ Naberezhnye Chelny players
Russian First League players
Russian Second League players